Woodtick or wood tick is the common name for several ticks, including:

Dermacentor variabilis, also known as the American dog tick
Dermacentor andersoni, also known as the Rocky Mountain wood tick

Animal common name disambiguation pages